Sadashiv Iyer (born 29 December 1972) is an Indian former first class cricketer. He is now an umpire and has stood in matches in the 2015–16 Ranji Trophy.

References

External links
 

1972 births
Living people
Indian cricketers
Indian cricket umpires
Vidarbha cricketers
Cricketers from Nagpur